Christos Chatziioannou (born 10 January 2004) is a Greek professional footballer who plays as a forward for Super League club Aris.

References

2004 births
Living people
Greek footballers
Super League Greece players
Aris Thessaloniki F.C. players
Association football forwards
Footballers from Thessaloniki